The following is a list of Singaporean Community Development Councils from 1997 to 2001.

A total of nine Community Development Councils were set up throughout Singapore in 1997. These were reduced and simplified to five CDCs in 2001 which is under the rationalisation programme:

 Ang Mo Kio-Cheng San CDC was merged into Central Singapore CDC.
 Bukit Timah CDC was merged into South West CDC.
 Hougang CDC was merged into North East CDC.
 Marine Parade CDC and Potong Pasir CDC were merged into South East CDC.
 Sembawang-Hong Kah CDC were split into North West CDC as well as South West CDC respectively.
 Tanjong Pagar CDC were split into Central Singapore CDC (only Tanjong Pagar GRC) and South West CDC (only West Coast GRC).

References 

 Community Development Council
1997 establishments in Singapore